Meridian Audio is a consumer audio and home theatre equipment manufacturer based in the United Kingdom. Bob Stuart and Allen Boothroyd founded the company in 1977 under the name Boothroyd-Stuart. In 1985 the company released a CD player under the brand name, Meridian. The company also created the lossless compression format Meridian Lossless Packing (used by DVD-Audio) in 1998 and the lossy Master Quality Authenticated (MQA) format in 2014.

History

Based in Huntingdon, Cambridgeshire, Meridian Audio was founded by John Robert (Bob) Stuart and Allen Boothroyd in 1977. Since the company's inception, all Meridian products have been built in the UK.
The company claims it was the among the first to introduce active loudspeakers designed for the domestic market  and was the first British company to manufacture a CD player in 1983.  The Meridian MCD, launched in 1985, was the first audiophile CD player.

Hobbyists favoured the company's products, engineers ran the company, and instead of marketing their products the company focused on making technical improvements to them. During the pre-2007 economic boom, exports made up 80 per cent of Meridian's sales.

Following the 2008 financial crisis and subsequent recession the firm underwent three years of restructuring and experienced a 50% reduction in sales to the U.S.A but a 10% increase in overall sales. The company also reduced its product line from 120 products to 35.

The organisation acquired the media server manufacturer Sooloos in late 2008. The acquisition gave Meridian an entry into the media server market. Following the deal, Sooloos released new products under the name Meridian Sooloos.

The company opened its first shop in Bangkok, Thailand in November 2009, followed by three more retail outlets in Seoul, Santiago and Mexico and a U.K. branch in Oxford.

In the same year, the organisation announced John Buchanan would take over from Tim Ireland as CEO.

Since 2011, Meridian has developed a long-term relationship with Jaguar Land Rover, which has enabled customers to enjoy the finest premium audio across their entire portfolio of vehicles.  Together, Meridian and Jaguar Land Rover have brought innovations and new features to market, including 3D surround sound for the all-new Range Rover 2012 and the first high-end audio system in a battery electric vehicle with the award-winning Jaguar I-Pace in 2016. 

Stuart resigned from the company in September 2017.

Meridian partnered with the South Korean company LG in 2018 for a jointly developed range of audio equipment. Meridian provided engineering support for the range of soundbars, speakers, earphones and smartphones and advised on matters such as component choice. This relationship continues to go from strength to strength as showcased by the launch of the 2021 LG soundbar line up, which features Meridian Horizon technology.

In 2019, British Airways became a Meridian customer and saw the company develop a set of in-flight headphones that reduce resonance, distortion and reflection.

Boothroyd resigned as director in March 2020.

In 2020, the company signed up the Chinese company, Human Horizons as a customer to create a 600Watt sound system for their electric vehicle manufacturer HiPhi. The system has twelve speakers in total and a digital EQ controlled by AI.

2020 was also the year that Meridian launched its distribution company, Distributed by Meridian (DbM) to grow sales opportunities in the UK & Eire. The company have since signed distribution agreements with Barco Residential, Display Technologies, Complete Acoustic Treatment System, Waterfall Audio and Trinnov.

In the same year, Meridian became the first high-end audio brand to release the “Works with Sonos” integration for its zone controllers. 

In 2021, Meridian has also designed immersive in-car audio systems to integrate within Rivian’s ground-breaking range of fully electric adventure vehicles, including the R1T and R1S; and a purpose-designed 14-speaker surround sound systems for the Kia K8.

Meridian MCD, J
In 1984, the two founders, operating under the name Boothroyd-Stuart created a CD player under the brand name Meridian. They named the device the MCD, J.
Having acknowledged that they lacked the experience or manufacturing facilities to create a CD player from scratch, Boothroyd-Stuart turned to Phillips, who allowed small companies to purchase their CD-101 decks and design their own cases and interfaces. The two co-founders suspected that the mechanical parts and electronics of mass-produced CD players negated the overall sound quality. Specifically, they felt that a lot of the sonic faults were not down to the system itself but to imperfections in the digital data extraction, the D/A conversion and the audio output circuitry. Moreover, they believed physically stabilizing the disc in the player eliminated the digital signal decoding errors caused by vibrations. Therefore, they discarded the deck’s analog audio circuitry and improved the unit’s power supply. Most-importantly they sped up the deck’s laser-tracking servo’s focus reaction time so that it could track warped discs better. They also installed a new audio board with better grounding and shielding capabilities, aluminum electrolytic output coupling capacitors and a 3-pole analog filter section.

Ultra DAC D/A processor
After Stuart's departure to MQA ltd, chief technical officer, Richard Hollinshead led Meridian's design team that created the digital audio converter (DAC). The converter uses a type of hierarchical conversion technology and has adjustable up-sampling filters.

Awards and recognition
Meridian products have received several awards, including:
 2011 Robb Report Best of the Best, Audio: Meridian Sooloos Digital Media System
 2010 CEA Human Interface Product of the Year: Meridian Sooloos
 2009 Robb Report Best of the Best, Home Video: Meridian 810 Reference Video System
 2009 CEA Innovations Design and Engineering Award in the Integrated Home Systems: Meridian Sooloos 
 1988 British Design Council Award: Meridian 200 Series
 1982 British Design Council Award: Meridian Modular Amplifier System

Museum exhibits
New York's Museum of Modern Art, keeps The Lecson Audio System, Boothroyd and Stuart's first sound system on permanent exhibit. London's Victoria and Albert Museum keeps the Lecson Audio System in storage.

See also
 Meridian Lossless Packing, compression for DVD-Audio.
 Master Quality Authenticated, launched by Meridian Audio in 2014.

References

External links
 

Audio amplifier manufacturers
Compact Disc player manufacturers
Audio equipment manufacturers of the United Kingdom
Loudspeaker manufacturers
Electronics companies established in 1977
English brands
1977 establishments in England